The 1981 Little League World Series took place between August 25 and August 29 in Williamsport, Pennsylvania. The Taiping Little League of Taichung, Taiwan, defeated the Belmont Heights Little League of Tampa, Florida, in the championship game of the 35th Little League World Series.

This was the fifth consecutive title for Taiwan. , this is the longest LLWS winning streak by any single country or U.S. state.

Teams

Championship bracket

Position bracket

Notable players
Derek Bell (Tampa, Florida) – MLB outfielder from 1991 to 2001
Maurice Crum Sr. (Tampa, Florida) - 2-time NCAA Football Champion (Miami Hurricanes)
Dan Wilson (Barrington, Illinois) – MLB catcher from 1992 to 2005

External links

Little League World Series
Little League World Series
Little League World Series